is a Japanese racing driver. He currently drives in the Super GT series for Toyota Gazoo Racing Team Zent Cerumo.

Born in Tokyo, Ishiura won the Super GT300 championship, in the APR MR-S with Kazuya Oshima, and was the 2015, and 2017 Super Formula champion driving for Cerumo・INGING.

Racing record

Complete Formula Nippon/Super Formula results
(key) (Races in bold indicate pole position) (Races in italics indicate fastest lap)

Complete Super GT results

External links
Official website
Profile on driverdb

1981 births
Living people
Japanese racing drivers
Japanese Formula 3 Championship drivers
Formula Nippon drivers
Super Formula drivers
Super GT drivers
Team LeMans drivers
Toyota Gazoo Racing drivers
Nürburgring 24 Hours drivers
TOM'S drivers